Burnley Cricket Club is a cricket club in the Lancashire League based at Turf Moor in Burnley, Lancashire.

The club was a founder member of the Lancashire League in 1892 and has won the League Championship 17 times, the Worsley Cup 10 times and the 20/20 Cup three times.

The club has seen huge success in recent years including becoming the first Club to win the Worsley Cup four years in a row in 2013, 2014, 2015 and 2016, as well as enjoying a record breaking season in 2015 in which they won all four senior trophies; the league, the Worsley Cup, the 20/20 Competition, and the Ron Singleton Colne Trophy. In addition the club also won the 2nd XI League and finished as runners-up in the Third XI League.

In 2019, they again finished the season in first place. For the 2021 season the captain is Daniel Pickup, and the Club Professional is Ockert Erasmus.

History
During the Middle Ages Turf Moor was one of Burnley's commons and the inhabitants likely cut turf here for fuel.

Burnley Cricket Club has its origin in a side called the Trafalgar Club, known to have played a match in the Bull Croft (near the town hall) in 1828. Over the next few years they played matches at Stoneyholme and Healey Heights, before taking the name Burnley Cricket Club by 1833. A field near Red Lion Street then became their home until in 1843 they moved to Turf Moor. After two years here, the team played for another two near Duke Bar before making Turf Moor their permanent home. In 1857 the team was disestablished, and between 1859 and 1863 a team organised by the Burnley Militia, called the Burnley Wellington Club, played at the ground. In 1864 Burnley Cricket Club was re-formed and was soon making progress, fielding three teams.

Notable matches in the period before a league was organised include: A three-day visit from the All-England Eleven (then headed by George Parr) in 1868; matches against an Australian eleven, featuring Fred Spofforth and Billy Murdoch, in 1878 and 1880, of which Burnley won the first; and an 1890-match between two visiting ladies' teams which attracted thousands of spectators.

The cricket club sponsored the formation of Burnley Football Club, and in January 1883, they leased seven acres of land for the team, situated between the cricket field and Bee Hole Colliery to the east. They also made a donation of £65 (the equivalent of £ as of ) toward the setup costs. In 1885, a dispute broke out as the cricketers complained that the footballers left the shared dressing room uncleaned and did not pay toward repairs. In 1889, after more disputes, Burnley F.C. separated from the cricket club and agreed to pay £77 per year (the equivalent of £ as of ) to rent the stadium.

In the early years of the Lancashire League, Burnley were one of the dominant teams, champions six times by 1913, including three-in-a-row from 1906.

Honours

1st XI League Winners - 17 - 1893, 1897, 1901, 1906, 1907, 1908, 1913, 1950, 1956, 1964, 1970, 1978, 1979, 2006, 2015, 2019, 2021
Worsley Cup Winners - 10 - 1950, 1953, 1958, 1960, 1975, 1984, 2013, 2014, 2015, 2016
20/20 Cup Winners - 3 - 2009, 2015, 2018
Ron Singleton Colne Trophy Winners - 3 - 2007, 2015, 2021
2nd XI League Winners - 10 - 1893, 1903, 1906, 1929, 1931, 1961, 1968, 2002, 2015, 2022
2nd XI (Lancashire Telegraph) Cup Winners - 2 - 1984, 2004
3rd XI League Winners - 1 - 2006

Notable players

James Anderson
Sydney Barnes
Arthur Bell
Richard Boys
David Brown
Fred Brown
Michael Brown
Jonathan Clare
Billy Cook
Henry Cudworth
Jerry Dawson
John Kettley
Tommy Lawton
Hal Pickthall
Elisha Rawlinson
Frank Sugg
Walter Sugg
Vishal Tripathi
Thomas Wardall

See also
Lowerhouse Cricket Club - another Lancashire League team from Burnley

References

Notes

Citations

External links
A Brief History of Burnley Cricket Club
Burnley Clean Up 2015

Lancashire League cricket clubs
Sport in Burnley
1833 establishments in England
Cricket clubs established in 1833